Mary Theresa Hinterberger (January 15, 1954 – January 22, 2009) was the runner-up for title of Miss New York in 1975, later promoted to that title after the winner, Tawny Godin, won the Miss America contest.

Biography
Hinterberger was born in Buffalo, New York in 1954, and raised in Clifton Park. She was the oldest daughter of seven children.

After taking over the title of Miss New York in the Fall of 1975 (when Tawny Godin became Miss America), Hinterberger studied music at SUNY Potsdam. During her reign as Miss New York, she held speaking engagements for various companies during the year.

Later years
She moved to Texas in 1976, where she worked in the energy industry and had her own seismic brokerage company. She married Scott Seaman in December 2007. She died due to breast cancer in 2009, at age 54.

References

1954 births
2009 deaths
American beauty pageant contestants
People from Clifton Park, New York
Deaths from breast cancer
Miss New York winners
Place of birth missing